Joe Wright is an English film director.

Joe Wright may also refer to:

Joe Wright (baseball) (1869–1909), baseball player
Joe Wright (basketball) (born 1963), American basketball player
Joe Wright (businessman) (born 1938), American businessman
Joe Wright (footballer, born 1907) (1907–1936), English football goalkeeper
Joe Wright (footballer, born 1995), Welsh footballer for Doncaster Rovers
Joe Wright (greyhound trainer) (1855–1923)
Joe Wright (Kentucky politician), Kentucky politician and businessman
Joe Wright (rower) (born 1992), New Zealand rower
Joe Wright (rugby league) (1908–1967), English rugby league footballer

See also
Joseph Wright (disambiguation)
Joey Wright (born 1968), retired American basketball player